Elizabeth Key "Bess" Armstrong (born December 11, 1953) is an American film, stage, and television actress seen in the films The Four Seasons (1981), High Road to China (1983), Jaws 3-D (1983), and Nothing in Common (1986). Armstrong also starred in the ABC drama series My So-Called Life and had lead roles in a number of made-for-television films.

Early life
Armstrong was born in Baltimore, Maryland, the daughter of Louise Allen (née Parlange), who taught at Bryn Mawr, and Alexander Armstrong, an English teacher at the Gilman School. Her grandfather was Alexander Armstrong, Attorney General of Maryland. She attended the Bryn Mawr School for Girls and Brown University, from which she graduated with degrees in Latin and Theater (studying acting with Jim Barnhill and John Emigh). While at Bryn Mawr and Brown, Armstrong appeared in over one hundred stage plays.

Career
Armstrong's professional acting career began in 1975 with the Off-Off Broadway debut, Harmony House. Then, in 1977, Armstrong made her television debut as Julia Peters on the CBS sitcom, On Our Own. In 1978 Armstrong starred opposite Richard Thomas in her first TV-movie Getting Married. She co-starred again with Richard Thomas in a 1981 stage production in Seattle of Neil Simon's Barefoot in the Park, from which a video was made for HBO broadcast that year.

Armstrong continued to make several films for both the big and small screens in the 1980s, among them High Road to China opposite Tom Selleck; Jaws 3-D with Dennis Quaid; Alan Alda's The Four Seasons;  the TV miniseries Lace; and Nothing in Common, starring Tom Hanks and Jackie Gleason.

The 1990s brought Armstrong to her best-known role, playing Patty Chase on the series My So-Called Life. She later starred in several television films. In 2000, she appeared on the NBC sitcom Frasier, in the episode "Mary Christmas." In 2008, Armstrong played Penelope Kendall on ABC's Boston Legal. Armstrong remains active in films, television, and the stage. She had a recurring role in the Showtime series House of Lies as Julianne Hotschragar. She also appeared in Castle, Mad Men, NCIS, S.W.A.T., and Grey's Anatomy.

Personal life 
Armstrong married John Fiedler, an executive at Columbia Pictures, on April 12, 1986.

In 1991, she spoke out about her abortion in the book The Choices We Made: Twenty-Five Women and Men Speak Out About Abortion.

Filmography

Film

Television

References

External links

1953 births
American film actresses
American television actresses
Living people
Actresses from Baltimore
Brown University alumni
20th-century American actresses
21st-century American actresses
Bryn Mawr College alumni
Bryn Mawr School people